Ozark Mountain School District (OMSD) is a public school district that provides comprehensive education to its students from prekindergarten to grade 12 and is situated in the Ozark Mountains (hence the name of the district) and covers  in northern Arkansas, United States.
 
Within Searcy County the district includes St. Joe, Gilbert, and Pindall. Within Newton County the district includes Western Grove. The district also includes a section of Marion County.

History
OMSD formed in 2004 as a result of an Arkansas law stating that school districts must have a minimum of 350 students. This requirement led to the July 1, 2004 consolidation of three separate school districts, Bruno–Pyatt, St. Joe and Western Grove, into the Ozark Mountain School District. In 2012, the nearby Lead Hill School District failed in an attempt to consolidate with OMSD.

Schools 
Ozark Mountain School District consists of three separate K-12 campus: Bruno Pyatt, St. Joe, and Western Grove.

 High schools and middle schools
The three secondary education facilities that the district maintains are as follows:
 Bruno–Pyatt High School – Located in Eros, this Marion County-based school has the mascot of the Bears with gray and blue as its school colors.
 St. Joe High School – Located in St. Joe, this Searcy County-based school has the mascot of the Bears with gray and blue as its school colors.
 Western Grove High School – Located in Western Grove, this Newton County-based school has the mascot of the Bears with gray and blue as its school colors.

Each school was listed and unranked in the Best High Schools 2012 report developed by U.S. News & World Report.

 Elementary schools
 Bruno–Pyatt Elementary School
 St. Joe Elementary School
 Western Grove Elementary School

See also 

 List of school districts in Arkansas

References

Further reading
Includes boundaries of predecessor districts:
 2004-2005 School District Map
 Map of Arkansas School Districts pre-July 1, 2004
 (Download) - Includes maps of predecessor districts

External links 
 

Ozarks
School districts in Arkansas
Education in Marion County, Arkansas
Education in Newton County, Arkansas
Education in Searcy County, Arkansas
School districts established in 2004
2004 establishments in Arkansas